Henry Leeke or Leek may refer to:

People
 Henry Leeke (athlete) (died 1922), Cambridge athlete
 Henry Alan Leeke (1879–1915), British track and field athlete and Olympian, son of Henry Leeke
 Sir Henry John Leeke (1794–1870), Admiral in the Royal Navy and MP

Fictional characters
Henry Leek, character in The Great Adventure (1921 film)
Henry Leek, character in Holy Matrimony (1943 film)

See also
Henry Leke, MP